Inger Wikstrom (born 11 December 1939) is a Swedish pianist, composer and conductor.

Biography
Inger Wikstrom began studying piano in Stockholm at the age of six, and at sixteen played as soloist with the Stockholm Philharmonic Orchestra. She made successful debuts as a concert pianist in Stockholm, Berlin, London and New York City. Later concert tours included the United States, Latin America, Russia, Israel, Africa, China, Japan and Australia.

She married David Bartov and the couple moved with their three children to Österskär, where they opened the Nordic Music Conservatory in 1977, which became the Nordic Chamber Opera in 1980. Inger Wikström is a member of The Society of Swedish Composers and the Royal Swedish Academy of Music.

Inger Wikstrom is the sister of Gunnel Biberfeld and mother of opera director Mira Bartov. She was married to politician Jan-Erik Wikström 1980-1990.

Awards
Order of Cavalliero de Rio Branco
Adelaide Ristori Prize
Bartok medal
Villa Lobos medal
 Natur och Kultur Culture Award (1992)

Works
Inger Wikström has composed chamber music, song cycles, and a number of operas. Her recordings have been issued on more than forty albums.

Selected works include:
La Mère Coupable, opera
The Nightingale, opera
The Confession of a Fool chamber opera, text by August Strindberg
Peter Pan, fairy tale opera
A Madman's Defence, opera

References

1939 births
20th-century classical composers
21st-century classical composers
Living people
Swedish music educators
Swedish opera composers
Swedish classical composers
Women classical composers
Women opera composers
Swedish women composers
Women music educators
20th-century women composers
21st-century women composers
20th-century Swedish women